Carsharing in Moscow is a rapidly developing type of public transport in the city. As of January 2020 Moscow has the largest fleet of carsharing vehicles in the world which counts more than 30,000 cars ahead of such megacities as Tokyo, Beijing and Shanghai. In Moscow, more than 150,000 trips are made by carsharing cars every day. The largest carsharing operator in Moscow is Delimobil which has a fleet of 17,000 cars.

Overview 

In 2019 the growth of carsharing service in Moscow continued to boom and by the end of the year the total carsharing fleet in Moscow reached 30,000 vehicles almost doubling from the previous year. At the same time, in 2018 analysts at the consulting company PwC predicted that carsharing fleet in Moscow will reach 30,000 only by 2025. According to Vincenzo Trani who runs Delimobil, the second largest carsharing operator in Russia, the potential of the carsharing market in Moscow is at the level of 100,000 vehicles.

Operators and fleet 
The table below provides information about the largest carsharing operators in Moscow.

Long-time subscribing 
Some operators provide long-time rent from 1 month. Subscribe plan include car and milage, but not include free parking in city, washing and refueling

Statistics

History

2012

Moscow's first carsharing service was created on 21 December 2012 by Alexander Yermolenko, commissioned by Citycar, which was rebranded as Anytime. The company has launched a pilot project on 21 Volkswagen Polo vehicles.

2013

Anytime added a few BMW 1 Series cars to its fleet and expanded to 72 vehicles.

2014

In February 2014, StreetCar launched its own carsharing service in St Petersburg.

Anytime acquired a further 100 vehicles, adding the BMW 1 Series, Chevrolet Cruze, VW Polo and Hyundai Solaris to its fleet.

The same year Anytime launched the St Petersburg market with a plan to unite the two capitals in a common carsharing service, with the ability to take and leave cars in either city.

On 1 August 2014, the Moscow City Pay-Parking System is expanding to the boundaries of the Third Ring Road, which serves to raise the attention on carsharing as part of the Public Transportation System.

2015

Due to the low commercial success of carsharing in St Petersburg, StreetCar closes down  and Anytime stops operating its branch in St Petersburg, focusing on the Moscow market.

In 2015, Moscow's paid parking zone expanded beyond the Third Ring Road, giving a huge boost to carsharing in Russia.

Vincenzo Trani launched his own carsharing service Delimobil in September 2015. 

A new BelkaCar carsharing service has been announced.

Anytime launches a truck rental service for small trucks.

2016

Launch of BelkaCar, a new entrant to the carsharing market with a fleet of 100 cars.

The overall carshare fleet in Moscow has exceeded 1,500 cars.

2017

Transition to fully remote registration of users in the carsharing system, without signing paper contracts.

Anytime and BelkaCar cars appeared in Yandex Maps app. By the end of the year, Yandex will close the carshare aggregator project and develop its own service.

Delimobil comes to the St Petersburg market.

Moscow carsharing begins to expand in Russia's regions. Launch of new carsharing providers: Rentmee, Carousel, Carlion, Easyride, Carenda, Lifcar, Car4You.

2018

In May 2018, Anytime and Delimobil merged into a single entity, becoming the largest carsharing company in Russia. Vincenzo Trani and Mikro Kapital will take over full management of the companies.

Moscow-based Anytime is changing its business model to the premium segment. Anytime opens in Belarus, Kazakhstan and the Czech Republic.

Yandex launches its own carsharing service, Yandex.Drive, with a fleet of 750 cars.

2019

Delimobil is planning an IPO.

The number of rides on Moscow's carsharing system has reached 50mn.

The number of cars involved in carsharing reached 31,000.

The outstanding growth in the volume of carsharing vehicles in the Russian capital made it one of the leading car sharing market players worldwide. In 2019, Moscow beat the previous year’s leader - Tokyo.

2020

2021

2022

2023

Gallery

References

Moscow
Transport in Moscow